HMW may refer to:

 Hampton Wick railway station, in London
 Handbook of the Mammals of the World
 Homewood (Amtrak station), in Illinois, United States
 Western Mashan Miao language, spoken in China